The Sulawesi soft-furred rat (Eropeplus canus) is a species of rodent in the family Muridae.  It is the only species in the genus Eropeplus.
It is found only in Indonesia.
Its natural habitat is subtropical or tropical dry forest.
It is threatened by habitat loss.

References
 Baillie, J. 1996.  Eropeplus canus.   2006 IUCN Red List of Threatened Species.   Downloaded on 19 July 2007.

Rats of Asia
Old World rats and mice
Endemic fauna of Indonesia
Rodents of Sulawesi
Vulnerable fauna of Asia
Mammals described in 1921
Taxonomy articles created by Polbot